Kuhbach is a river of Lower Saxony, Germany. It flows into the Kleine Aue near Sulingen.

See also
List of rivers of Lower Saxony

References

Rivers of Lower Saxony
Rivers of Germany